69 Sexy Things 2 Do Before You Die (stylized 69 Sexy Things 2 Do B4U Die) was a Playboy TV adult newsmagazine profiling exotic locales, outdoor adventures and current erotic trends.

Premise
In a 2008 review, Multichannel News said the show "blend[s] eroticism with information" and is "essentially a travelogue — with nudity." Partially inspired by the film, The Bucket List, 69 Sexy Things 2 Do Before You Die highlighted sexually-themed activities for couples. Segments included sensual massages, naked scuba diving, a fetish convention in the Caribbean, a brothel in Prague and bachelor party essentials.

When it debuted, Christie Hefner, then CEO of Playboy Enterprises, called 69 Sexy Things 2 Do Before You Die her favorite new show on Playboy TV. The show was helmed by supervising producer and writer Kira Reed, who had previously appeared on Playboy TV's Sexcetera. The show's directors included Christopher Bavelles, and writers included Joe Diamond and Andrew Knock.

Format
The show had no formal host. Narrators and couples would guide viewers through each segment (usually two per episode), demonstrating how each activity should properly be carried out. Afterwards, website links were displayed for those who wished to follow up on the profile they had just seen.

Episodes

References

External links
 69 Sexy Things 2 Do Before You Die Official Site
 

2008 American television series debuts
2008 American television series endings
Television series by Playboy Enterprises
Playboy TV original programming